DYKC is a call sign used by Radio Philippines Network in Cebu. It may refer to:

 DYKC-TV, a television station broadcasting as RPN Cebu
 DYKC-AM, an AM radio station broadcasting as Radyo Ronda Cebu